Lausi is a municipality (suco) in Aileu subdistrict, Aileu District, East Timor. The administrative area covers an area of 5.24  square kilometres and at the time of the 2010 census it had a population of 665  people.

References

Populated places in Aileu District
Sucos of East Timor